Jap was an unincorporated community located in Raleigh County, West Virginia, United States.

References

Unincorporated communities in West Virginia
Unincorporated communities in Raleigh County, West Virginia